Goutz is a commune in the Gers department in southwestern France.

Geography
The river Petite Auroue forms all of the commune's eastern border, then flows into the Auroue, which flows northeast through the commune and forms part of its southwestern and northern borders.

Population

See also
Communes of the Gers department

References

Communes of Gers